The Women's 10 kilometre classical event of the FIS Nordic World Ski Championships 2017 was held on 28 February 2017. A 5 kilometre classical qualification competition was held on 22 February 2017 for those participants that do not have enough FIS points to qualify automatically to other distances in the World Ski Championships.

Results

Qualification
The qualification was held on 22 February 2017.

Final
The final was started at 13:45.

References

Women's 10 kilometre classical
2017 in Finnish women's sport